This article lists the winners and nominees for the Black Reel Award for Outstanding First Screenplay. The award is given to the writers for their first screenplay debut.

Winners and nominees

2010s

2020s

References

Black Reel Awards